The 1991 FIBA Centennial Jubilee Basketball Tournament was the special edition tournament of the Acropolis International Basketball Tournament that was organized jointly by FIBA Europe and the Hellenic Basketball Federation to commemorate the 100 year anniversary of the sport of basketball. The tournament was held from June 5 to June 9, 1991, at the SEF Indoor Hall in Athens, Greece. The tournament was won by Italy, with Greece finishing in second place.

The Jubilee also included a FIBA Festival All-Star Game, which was divided up into a Balkans versus the rest of Europe format. The Balkans Selection won the all-star game, which took place on 8 June 1991, by a score of 103–102. The tournament is not counted officially with the other 29 Acropolis International Tournaments, because it was not solely organized by the Hellenic Basketball Federation.

Participating teams

Standings 

|-bgcolor="gold"

|}

Results

Final standings

The Balkans versus The Rest of Europe
In the FIBA Festival All-Star Game, the Balkans Selection took on a FIBA European Selection from the rest of Europe. The Balkans Seelction won the all-star game, by a score of 103–102. Nikos Galis, of The Balkans Selection Team, was the game's top scorer, with 22 points, while Jure Zdovc hit the game's winning shot.

"The FIBA European Selection" team consisted of:

 Epi
 Jordi Villacampa
 Antonio Martín
 Antonello Riva
 Walter Magnifico 
 Roberto Brunamonti 
 Richard Dacoury 
 Stéphane Ostrowski 
 Philip Szanyiel 
 Sergei Bazarevich
 Igors Miglinieks
 Andrejs Bondarenko
 Head Coach: Sandro Gamba

"The Balkans Selection" team consisted of:

 Toni Kukoč
 Dino Rađja
 Žarko Paspalj
 Jure Zdovc
 Zoran Savić
 Nikos Galis
 Panagiotis Giannakis
 Panagiotis Fasoulas
 Fanis Christodoulou
 Georgi Glouchkov
 Head Coach: Kostas Politis

External links
Hellenic Basketball Federation 1991 Jubilee  
Balkans vs. Europe 1991 Jubilee FIBA All-Star Game (Full Game)
Balkans vs. Europe 1991 Jubilee FIBA All-Star Game (Highlights)

Acropolis International Basketball Tournament
1990–91 in European basketball
1990–91 in Greek basketball
1990–91 in French basketball
1990–91 in Italian basketball
1991 in Soviet sport
1990–91 in Spanish basketball
1990–91 in Yugoslav basketball